Agrionia was an ancient Greek religious festival in honor of Dionysus Agrionius. It was celebrated annually, especially at Orchomenus in Boeotia.

According to Plutarch, agrionia was celebrated at night with only women accompanied by the priests of Dionysus, who often wore black garments. Women pretended to search for Dionysos and then declared that he has fled to the Muses and hidden there. After that they feasted and begun to present and solve riddles.

They cast lots to decide which of their children they would eat and selected Hippasus, son of Leucippe.

Plutarch also explains that the festival included a human sacrifice. At this festival it was originally the custom for the priest of the god to pursue a woman of the Minyan family with a drawn sword and kill her. This practice was later discontinued after the occurrence of bad omens.

References

Attribution:

Festivals in ancient Boeotia
Greek festivals of Dionysus